Missouri Route 370 (Route 370) is a freeway that connects St. Louis County with St. Charles County via the Discovery Bridge over the Missouri River. The St. Charles County segment of the freeway is signed as the Patrick J. Bray Memorial Highway.

Route description
Route 370 begins in St. Peters at a Y-interchange at I-70 exit 224 east of Mid Rivers Mall Drive and proceeds northeast. It loops around Fountain Lakes Park and crosses Cole Creek before turning to a southeasterly direction. It then passes north of St. Charles and interchanges with Route 94 at exit 7 before crossing the Missouri River. It then forms a Parclo interchange as it interchanges with Route 141 at exit 9 north of Earth City as it continues east. The route ends in Bridgeton, forming another Y-interchange at exits 22A and 22B on I-270 west of Missouri Bottom Road.

History
Construction on Route 370 began in the early 1990s. It was built to replace the section of St. Charles Rock Road, then designated as Route 115, west of I-270.

MoDOT applied for an interstate highway designation of Interstate 370, but AASHTO rejected this in favor of the designation of Interstate 870. MoDOT did not want this because I-870 was their intended designation for what is now Interstate 255.

On December 16, 1992, the first section of the highway opened allowing direct access to St. Charles at Route 94 from I-270. It replaced the crumbling Old St. Charles Bridge that carried Route 115 traffic. On April 1, 1993, the road was designated as Route 370. In 1993, the Great Flood of 1993 surrounded much of the highway which is built on top of an embankment. As the flood waters surrounded the highway, many of the new exits had been shut down because the roads it connected to were underwater. Despite the flood, construction resumed on the highway until it was completed in 1996.

Exit list

See also

References

370
370
Transportation in St. Louis County, Missouri
Transportation in St. Charles County, Missouri
Freeways in the United States